Hard count is one process for counting coins in a casino or bank. The hard count rooms are usually among the most secure places due to the large amounts of cash that can be on hand at any one time.

Typically, coins are not counted on a piece basis. Instead, they are separated by denomination into containers and weighed using large scales. Each scale is programmed so that it can automatically derive the value of the container's contents from its weight. An exception to this is in casinos, where high denomination casino tokens (for example, $25 and above) may be counted by hand.

The opposite of hard count is soft count in which banknotes are counted.

References

Coins
Banking terms